The Americas Zone was one of three zones of regional competition in the 2013 Fed Cup.

Group I
Venue: Country Club de Ejecutivos, Medellín, Colombia (outdoor clay)
Dates: 6–9 February

The eight teams were divided into two pools of four teams. The two pool winners took part in play-offs to determine the nation advancing to the World Group II Play-offs. The nations in second place in each pool played off against each other to determine the final positions within the group. For the relegation Play-off, the nations in third place in each pool played off against the nations in fourth position in the other pool to determine which two nations were relegated to Americas Zone Group II in 2014.

Pools

Play-offs

 advanced to World Group II play-offs.

Group II
Venue: Maya Country Club, Santa Tecla, El Salvador
Dates: 16–20 July

The eleven teams were divided into two pools of five and six teams. The winner of each pool was promoted to Americas Zone Group I in 2014.

Pools

See also
Fed Cup structure

References

 Fed Cup Result, 2013 Americas Group I
 Fed Cup Result, 2013 Americas Group II

External links
 Fed Cup website

 
Americas
Sport in Medellín
Tennis tournaments in Colombia
La Libertad Department (El Salvador)
Tennis tournaments in El Salvador
2013 in Colombian tennis